HTTPd is a software program that usually runs in the background, as a process, and plays the role of a server in a client–server model using the HTTP and/or HTTPS network protocol(s).

The process waits for the incoming client requests and for each request it answers by replying with requested information, including the sending of the requested web resource, or with an HTTP error message.

HTTPd stands for Hypertext Transfer Protocol daemon.

It usually is the main software part of an HTTP server better known as a web server.

Some commonly used implementations are:
 Apache HTTP Server
 BusyBox httpd
 CERN HTTPd HTTP server
 Cherokee HTTP server
 Hiawatha HTTP server with reverse proxy functionality
 Lighttpd HTTP server
 NCSA HTTPd HTTP server
 Nginx HTTP and reverse proxy server
 OpenBSD's httpd (since OpenBSD 5.6)
 Thttpd HTTP server
 TUX web server aka kHTTPd

See also
 HTTP server
 Web server
 Comparison of web server software

References

External links
 Example of an HTTPd: httpd - Apache Hypertext Transfer Protocol Server